Gulbahar (Persian: گلبهار) is located 76 km north the Afghanistan capital Kabul. Gulbahar is a green, lush area with the best mulberry in the country.

History
This war torn district, which was the battlefield between different forces in different eras, is located half in Parwan province and half in Kapisa province. A major textile company and Al-Beroni University exist within the Kapisa section of Gulbahar.

Images

See also
 Parwan Province

References

Populated places in Parwan Province